La petite mort ("The little death") is a metaphor for a sexual orgasm.

Little Death may also refer to:

 Little Death (album), 2008, by Pete & The Pirates
 A Little Death, a 1994 New Zealand film
 The Little Death (2006 film), an American thriller film directed by Morgan Nichols
 The Little Death (2014 film), an Australian comedy film directed by Josh Lawson
 Little Deaths (anthology), an anthology book edited by Ellen Datlow
 Little Deaths (film), a 2011 British horror anthology film directed by Sean Hogan, Andrew Parkinson and Simon Rumley
 The Little Deaths, an American rock band
 "Little Death", a song by +44 from the 2006 album When Your Heart Stops Beating
 "Little Death", a song by Goldfrapp from the 2004 album Wonderful Electric: Live in London
 "Little Death", a song by Lupe Fiasco from the 2015 album Tetsuo & Youth
 The Little Death, also known as La petite mort, a 1995 short film by François Ozon
 The Little Death, a 1996 album by Ruth Ruth

See also
 La petite mort (disambiguation)